The incorporated town of Kimberly, a sparsely inhabited area on the south side of Murfreesboro, Arkansas, began in late 1908 as an ill-fated land-development project spanning almost .  At the time, the recently discovered Arkansas diamond field was still generating a speculative heyday, and the enterprising property owner, Millard M. (M. M.) Mauney, envisioned a dynamic settlement based upon a future mining industry.  His location was perfect.  The diamond field lay only a half-mile away.   The planned extension of a railroad into Murfreesboro from the southwest would cut through Kimberly, facilitating investments and development.

Opening ceremony
On the weekend of January 22–23, 1909, Mauney and associates staged the opening ceremony for the grand venture.  Helping stir publicity, the discoverer of the diamond field, "Diamond John" Huddleston, was on hand to buy Lot No. 1 for a token $70.

Buildings
In 1909–1910, the promoters secured a few wood-frame businesses, including a small bank, a compact three-story hotel, and a little general store.  There were also plans for a large business center featuring a club "for the entertainment and accommodation of those interested in the diamond lands, and [for] prospectors who may visit that section."  Meanwhile, speculative investors bought a considerable number of residential lots.

End of the venture
Mauney's success, however, depended upon commercial testing at the main diamond field and at similar volcanic deposits nearby, and failure was assured as commercial yields constantly proved elusive.  In February 1910, local investors abandoned the idea of building the club and adjacent business complex.  As activity continued dwindling, the venture formally ended in July 1911.

Return to agriculture
Eventually, Mauney's heirs recovered full ownership of almost all the property he had dedicated to the project.  The few buildings were removed, and almost all the platted Kimberly township reverted to agricultural land.  Contrary to a recurring description, there is no "ghost town".

Kimberly today
Today, the former Kimberly addition consists of about a dozen modern homes along State Highway 301 - the "Diamond Mine Road" which passes through Crater of Diamonds State Park.

References
 Banks, Dean, Arkansas Diamonds: Dreams, Myths, and Reality, Online edition, copyright 2006, available at 

Geography of Pike County, Arkansas
Ghost towns in Arkansas